The Wakadaishō series is a series of films starring Yūzō Kayama and Kunie Tanaka. The first film in the series was Daigaku no Wakadaishō from 1961.

Masao Kusakari portrayed the role of Wakadaishō in two other films.

All of the films star Kayama as Yuichi Tanuma, nicknamed the  meaning "young ace" or "whizz kid" for his prowess in various sports. His perpetual antagonist is the lecherous Shinjiro Ishiyama, played by Kunie Tanaka, who is nicknamed , the Japanese name of the Japanese rat snake.

Yuzo Kayama as Wakadaishō

Masao Kusakari as Wakadaishō

References

Japanese film series
1960s Japanese films